Maria Kursova (born 3 January 1986) is a Russian-Armenian chess player. She was awarded the title of Woman Grandmaster by FIDE in 2007. Kursova was world girls champion and European girls champion in her age category.

Career

Born in Severodvinsk, Kursova won the World Youth Chess Championships in the Girls U10 category in 1996. She also won three medals at the European Youth Chess Championships: in 1998 she took the bronze medal in the Girls U12 section, three years later Kursova won the Girls U16 title, and in 2003 she tied with Natalia Pogonina for first place, placing second on countback, in the Girls U18 event.

Kursova competed in the Women's World Chess Championship 2006 as one of the FIDE president nominees. Kursova defeated Zhao Xue in the first round to advance to the second. She lost to Ekaterina Kovalevskaya and was therefore eliminated from the competition.

Kursova switched her national federation to Armenia in 2011. She won the Armenian women's championship in 2012 and 2018. Kursova played for the Armenian team in the Women's Chess Olympiad, Women's World Team Chess Championship, and Women's European Team Chess Championship.

References

External links

Maria Kursova chess games at 365Chess.com

1986 births
Living people
Chess woman grandmasters
Armenian female chess players
Russian female chess players
World Youth Chess Champions
People from Severodvinsk
Russian emigrants to Armenia
Naturalized citizens of Armenia